Pagkakaisa ng mga Samahan mga Tsuper at Opereytor Nationwide, also known by its abbreviation PISTON is a national federation of public transport associations in the Philippines. It is affiliated with the Philippine trade union center Kilusang Mayo Uno.

Internationally, PISTON is affiliated with the International Transport Workers' Federation.

Background
Established in 1981, PISTON is a national federation of drivers and operators' associations focusing on issues related to the public transportation sector, especially the rights of drivers and operators of public utility vehicles (PUVs) – including jeepneys, taxis, vans, multicabs, tricycles, pedicabs and buses.

Additionally, PISTON aims to promote and advance the basic demands of Filipino transport workers for decent and stable work, livable income, and all their democratic rights.

As a partylist organization
PISTON has attempted in the past to have partylist representation in the House of Representatives.

They have applied to take part in the 2013 election. The Commission on Election unanimously approved their application since they have established that they are representing drivers.  However the candidacy was subject to a disqualification case due to allegedly violating campaign posters rules and was bared to fill seats in the legislature. 

The petition was ruled "defective for the lack of specificity" and PISTON was eventually allowed to take part in the 2016 election. They did not win a seat. They were disqualified for the 2019 election, due to failure to win a seat in the past two elections.

Electoral performance

Activism

In 2013, PISTON launched a campaign directed to the Philippines' main petroleum companies, Petron, Shell, and Chevron to condemn against an oil price hike. They have also urged the abolishment of the Oil Deregulation Law in 2015.

The have also opposed the mandatory phaseout of old vehicles under the Public Utility Vehicle Modernization Program. They had participated in strikes in protest of the program in 2015, 2017 to 2019 and 2023.

External links 

 Official website

References

1981 establishments in the Philippines
Transportation organizations based in the Philippines
Trade unions in the Philippines
Activism in the Philippines